Todos Tus Muertos is the debut album by Argentine band Todos Tus Muertos released in 1988, and give them some successes needed to be known on a larger scale by taking them on tour in other countries.

Background 
The album is considered an artistic breakthrough for Todos Tus Muertos, being the first full-length release to consist entirely of the band. Horacio "Gamexane" played a variety of styles not usually associated with the mainstream rock music, with a darker sound and the gloomy lyrics along almost the entire album. Fidel Nadal played the kalimba on "Dieciocho Horas" and "Días de Escuela". Much of the music-style was still rooted in British post-punk and north-American hardcore punk.

Recorded at Panda Studios, Buenos Aires and produced by Carlos "Mundy" Epifanio. The biggest album's hit song is "Gente que No" (People who do not) song that was written with Jorge Serrano (when was part of the band). It was the only Todos Tus Muertos album to be recorded entirely to the RCA label. In 1997 DBN reissued the LP on CD.

Track listing 
All songs written by Felix Gutierrez, Fidel Nadal and Horacio Villafañe, except where noted.

Personnel 
Todos Tus Muertos
Fidel Nadal - Lead vocals and Kalimba.
Horacio "Gamexane" Villafañe - Lead guitar and backing vocals, Second vocals on "Más Majo que tu Status".
Félix Gutierrez - Bass guitar and backing vocals, Lead vocals on "Viejos de Mierda".
Cristian Ruiz - Drums.

Collaborators
David Wrocklavsky - Keyboards.
Sergio Rotman - Sax.

Additional credit 
Walter Chacon - Engineer.
Felix Gutierrez and Andy Cherniavsky - Photography.
Mundy Epifanio - Executive Producer.
Horacio "Gamexane" Villafañe - Producer.

References

1988 debut albums
Todos Tus Muertos albums